Local elections were held in Turkey on 2 June 1968. In the elections, both the mayors and the local parliaments were elected. The figures presented below are the results of the local parliament elections.

Results

Provincial assemblies

Mayors

References

Local elections in Turkey
Local